John Wimberley (born July 1945) is an American fine art photographer, known for his technical mastery and the spiritual dimension of his imagery. His bodies of work span more than five decades and include black and white landscapes and human figures, as well as mining camps and Native American rock art from the American West. More recently he switched to digital color photography of the rock art sites he has been exploring for more than twenty years.

Wimberley also is known for his contributions to the chemistry of developing photographic film, as a teacher of photographic vision, and as the author and co-author of five books on his life and work.

Wimberley's photographs have appeared in over 70 exhibitions worldwide, multiple publications, and over 500 collections. In 2010, he received the Oliver Rock Art Photography Award for his first book, a collection of his images of Native rock art titled Evidence of Magic.

Life and work

Early years 
John Wimberley was born in Bermuda in 1945 and moved to Alameda, California in 1948, where he lived until he enlisted in the United States Navy in 1963. In the Navy, John was trained and served as an Aviation Electronics Technician. He first began to explore photography using color film on the flight deck of the aircraft carrier during his tours in the Vietnam War. After his discharge from the Navy, Wimberley returned to the San Francisco Bay Area and worked as an electronics technician for Smith-Kline Instruments in Palo Alto, pursuing his photography during lunch hours on nearby Coyote Hill (1975)..

Influences 
As a photographer, Wimberley is self-taught, never having had instruction in camera use or photographic processing. He used books, experimentation, and persistence to teach himself to expose and develop negatives and print photographs. His first darkroom was in the closet of his studio apartment in East Palo Alto, California, where he processed sheets of film in trays on the floor.

In 1969, while photographing in Canyon Del Puerto, California, Wimberley "saw that physical objects, such as trees, also have a tangible and real spiritual dimension that can be perceived." After this experience, he began working exclusively with black-and-white film. At that time he felt that "black and white photography had the potential to embody and communicate the spiritual aspect of things."

In support of the spiritual dimension in his photography, Wimberley has studied actively and continuously. His interests and influences are in the areas of metaphysics and shamanism, including the works of Carl Jung and Carlos Castaneda. Wimberley's method includes active and deep meditation, and his studies and expertise have qualified him as a Tarot reader and yoga instructor in addition to his life as an artist and photographer.  

Starting in 1969, Wimberley spent more than fifty years away from color photography. He resigned from Smith-Kline Instruments at the beginning of 1981 and has made his living as an artist ever since.

Landscape photography 
With his emphasis on clarity, his use of large-format negatives, and his focus on the grandeur of the American West, Wimberley's landscapes can be viewed as a continuation of the tradition of Group f/64 from a generation before. Indeed, Wimberley knew and interacted with Ansel Adams, Brett Weston, Imogen Cunningham, and others associated with that tradition, even to the point of having two two-person shows with Adams in the 1980s, but Wimberley was not an adherent or follower of any group. He has continued to produce iconic landscape images throughout his career, from Crater Lake, 1977 and Racetrack Valley, 1981 to Casa Diablo #1767, 2019. In many of these, clouds above a sharp horizon serve to suggest a scene that extends well beyond the scenery.

Human figures 
In the early 1980s, in an abrupt departure from landscape, Wimberley made a series of images of a friend of his in an acquaintance's swimming pool. These photographs, made both under water and looking down from above the surface, form a distinct portfolio. By far the most famous of these, and the most famous and most sought-after of his entire catalog, is Descending Angel, 1981 .

Transition to petroglyphs 
In 1985 and 1986, Wimberley traveled to New Zealand and Ireland. The portfolios from these trips are small, including such images as Wreck of the Ranga, 1986 , but the impact of his travels was significant. Impressed by the expanded sense of time and human habitation—the standing stones and ancient rock walls—Wimberley returned with newfound interest in the impact of past cultures on his native land. From the late 1980s, Wimberley began to explore abandoned mining camps and ghost towns, such as Owens Valley #39, 1996 , then in 1999 transitioned to photographing Native American rock art sites, a subject he has not turned from since.

Camping for weeks at time in his VW van, Wimberley ranged across Eastern Oregon, the Great Basin, and Owens Valley. He continued to make images of the surrounding landscape, but an increasingly prolific body of work focused on the rock art itself. Into the early 2000s he continued his devotion to black and white large format negatives, such as Bitter Ridge #7, 2002, but in 2018 closed up his darkroom and pivoted entirely to digital color images (Lone Grave Butte #2258, 2018).

Beyond the images

Film Developing 

In pursuit of the clarity and tonal characteristics Wimberley demanded of his black and white work, from the beginning of his career he undertook research and experimentation with the chemistry of film developing. His inquiry focused on Pyrogallol or “pyro,” a compound popularized a century prior, but which had fallen out of favor as unreliable. In 1977, the first fruit of Wimberley's research was published by Petersen Photographic Magazine in his formula for WD2D, a new pyrogallol-based film developer. WD2D is similar to earlier formulas in the way it promotes high sharpness and smooth tonalities. However, WD2D differs from older pyro developers like that used by Edward Weston because WD2D is formulated to work well with modern single-emulsion black-and-white films.

Wimberley continued to push the limits of the medium, and in 1987, Wimberley licensed the formula for his WD2D+ developer to Photographer's Formulary. WD2D+ is a specialized version of his WD2D. Photographer's Formulary continues to sell both of Wimberley's pyrogallol formulas.

Wimberley's extensive work photographing petroglyphs and other rock art across the American West challenged the limits of film developing even more. Because many petroglyphs consist of extremely faint images on the surface of rocks, the tonal range must be expanded to represent the petroglyph in a satisfactory way. To accomplish this, Wimberley modified his WD2D formula to function better when greatly expanding the contrast range of his negatives. The result of this work was WD2H+. In 2009, the formula for Wimberley's WD2H+ film developer was published in the third edition of The Darkroom Cookbook.

Teaching 
In the decades before and after 2000, Wimberley developed and taught more than two dozen sessions of his workshop titled “Sight & Insight”. Each workshop consisted of two full days of guided exercises, explorations, and discussions intended to help photographers expand and deepen their selections of and relationships with their photographic subjects. Exercises included field trips and experiments with point of view and scale. The goal was to relax intention and foster radical presence and the ability to follow “flirts” or inclinations to look elsewhere. Technical expertise and the equipment itself were not topics of discussion; Wimberley insisted the technology not interfere with the photographer's absolute presence and sense of having permission from the subject. In the workshops after 2000, Wimberley was helped by his assistant, the photographer Ann Quinn.

The Work

Notable photographs 

 San Francisco from Mt. Tamalpais, 1977
 Crater Lake, 1977
 Dunes and Horizontal Ripples, 1979 
 Racetrack Valley, 1981
 Descending Angel, 1981 
 Lough Bunny, 1986 
 Wreck of the Ranga, 1986
 Carmel Valley from Hall’s Ridge, 1993
 Landscape for Two Ravens, 1995
 Owens Valley #39, 1996
 Bitter Ridge #7, 2002
 Lone Grave Butte #2258, 2018
 Casa Diablo #1767, 2019

Books 
Evidence of Magic: Photographs 1999-2008: Petroglyphs of the Great Basin

A Metaphysic of Light: Photographs 1970-1988

Dreaming at the Edge: Photographs 1989-2013

Gestures to the Spirit: Photography and Beyond (extended interview conducted by writer Stephen Quinn)

My Home is a Place of Light (photographs by John Wimberley; poems by Stephen Quinn)

Video 
John Wimberley, American Master: A Metaphysic of Light. A Robert L Burrill Film (60 min.)

Selected Major Exhibitions

2020     
Camerawork Gallery, Portland, Oregon

WBB Gallery, Zurich, Switzerland

2018     
LightBox Photographic Gallery, Astoria, Oregon

Bullivant Gallery, St. Louis, MO

2017     
LightBox Photographic Gallery, Astoria, Oregon

2016     
Viewpoint Gallery, Sacramento, California

2015     
Bullivant Gallery, St. Louis, MO

2014     
Joel B. Garzoli Fine Art, San Francisco, California

Harvey Milk Photography Center, San Francisco, California

2013     
Foothill College, Cupertino, California

2012     
Newspace Center for Photography, Portland, Oregon

2011     
Gallery of Classical Photography, Moscow, Russia

Carnegie Museum of Art, Oxnard, California

Point Light Gallery, Sydney, Australia

2010     
Joel B. Garzoli Fine Art, San Francisco, CA

LightBox Gallery, Astoria, OR

Point Light Gallery, Sydney, Australia

Seattle Municipal Tower Gallery, Seattle, WA

2009     
PhotoCentral, Hayward, CA

Benham Gallery, Seattle, WA (two-person show with Ann Quinn)

Viewpoint Gallery, Sacramento, CA

Rogue Gallery, Medford, OR

2008     
The Creativity Center, Bainbridge Island, WA

422 Gallery, Phoenix, AZ

Hackettstown Art Museum, Hackettstown, NJ

Portland Museum of Art, Portland, OR

2007     
University of Portland, Portland, OR

Camerawork Gallery, Portland, OR

Paul Paletti Gallery, Louisville, KY

Ryerson University, Toronto, Canada

2006     
Soulcatcherstudio.com, Santa Fe, NM

2005     
John Cleary Gallery, Houston, TX

2004     
Rare Images, Mount Shasta, CA

Silver State Gallery, Reno, NV

2002     
LensWork Gallery, Anacortes, WA

The Ansel Adams Gallery, Yosemite, CA

2001     
David Ashcraft Gallery, Oakhurst, CA

2000     
Lightworks Gallery, Sacramento, CA

1998     
The Ansel Adams Gallery, Pebble Beach, CA

1997     
Mumm Gallery, Napa Valley, CA

1995     
Monterey Peninsula Museum of Art, Monterey, CA

Julia's Gallery of Photography, Lexington, KY

1994     
Shapiro Gallery, San Francisco, CA

1992     
The Silver Image Gallery, Seattle, WA

1991     
Seipp Gallery, Palo Alto, CA 1990

Shapiro Gallery, San Francisco, CA

Jackson Fine Art, Atlanta, GA

1988     
Galerie Zur Stockeregg, Zurich, Switzerland

1987     
J. J. Brookings Gallery, San Jose, CA (2-person show with Ansel Adams)

1986     
De Anza College, Cupertino, CA

1985     
The Photographer's Gallery, Palo Alto, CA (2-person show with Ansel Adams)

Galerie Tabula, Tübingen, Germany

1984     
Arizona State University, Tempe, AZ

The Berkshire Museum, Pittsfield, MA

1983     
Fitzgerald Gallery, San Francisco, CA

University of Alabama, university, AL

Photography West Gallery, Carmel, CA

Mancini Gallery, Houston, TX

The Photographers' Gallery, Palo Alto, CA

Boston Visual Artists Union, Boston, MA

Museum of Contemporary Arts, Houston, TX

1982     
Collector's Gallery, Pacific Grove, CA

Utah State University, Logan, UT

1981     
Markham Gallery, San Jose, CA

Pacific Light Gallery, Santa Cruz, CA

1980     
Idaho State University, Pocatello, ID

Markham Gallery, San Jose, CA

Collector's Gallery, Pacific Grove, CA

1979     
Studio/Performance Gallery, Palo Alto, CA

Image Photo, New York, NY

University of Arizona, Tempe, AZ

Coos Art Museum, Coos Bay, OR

1978     
Stanford University, Stanford, CA

Palo Alto Cultural Center, Palo Alto, CA

Darkroom Workshop/Gallery, Berkeley, CA

Coos Art Museum, Coos Bay, OR

1977     
Shado' Gallery, Oregon City, OR

1974     
New Roses Gallery, Palo Alto, CA

1973     
Camerawork Gallery, Saratoga, CA

1970     
Friends of Photography, Carmel, CA

References

Sources
The Compass Rose: John Wimberley - Time Traveler with a Lens

LensWork interview and portfolio, issue #32

Energy and Photography by John Wimberley

Photographer John Wimberley points his lens to the heavens

Evidence of Magic, Ashland-based photographer John Wimberley uncovers traces of a hidden culture

The Oliver Rock Art Photography Award

External links
Visual Arts: Photographer John Wimberley points his lens to the heavens
Information on Pyrogallol-based film developers
John Wimberley's web site

1945 births
United States Navy personnel of the Vietnam War
Living people
Bermudian artists
People from Alameda, California
United States Navy sailors
Artists from the San Francisco Bay Area
People from Paget Parish
Photographers from California